"Dirty" Harry Moskowitz (born July 16, 1968) is an American mixed martial artist. He competed in the Super Heavyweight division. He won his last fight at XFC 1 - Xtreme Fight Club 1 against Johnnie Brown on November 14, 2003.

Mixed martial arts record

|-
| Win
| align=center| 6-12
| Johnnie Brown
| Decision
| XFC 1: Xtreme Fight Club 1
| 
| align=center| 0
| align=center| 0:00
| Morgan City, Louisiana, United States
| 
|-
| Loss
| align=center| 5-12
| Nathan Sanchez
| Submission (strikes)
| RCF 21: Reality Combat Fighting 21
| 
| align=center| 1
| align=center| 1:10
| Chalmette, Louisiana, United States
| 
|-
| Loss
| align=center| 5-11
| Johnathan Ivey
| Submission (kneebar)
| BONO 6: Battle of New Orleans 6
| 
| align=center| 1
| align=center| 0:45
| Metairie, Louisiana, United States
| 
|-
| Win
| align=center| 5-10
| Travis Zupanc
| TKO
| EC: Extreme Combat
| 
| align=center| 0
| align=center| 0:00
| Fridley, Minnesota, United States
| 
|-
| Loss
| align=center| 4-10
| Dan Severn
| Submission (keylock)
| RCF 11: Reality Combat Fighting 11
| 
| align=center| 1
| align=center| 2:12
| 
| 
|-
| Loss
| align=center| 4-9
| Allan Sullivan
| Submission (ankle lock)
| RSF 2: Reality Submission Fighting 2
| 
| align=center| 1
| align=center| 6:49
| 
| 
|-
| Loss
| align=center| 4-8
| Travis Fulton
| Submission (armbar)
| SFC: Submission Fighting Championships 11
| 
| align=center| 1
| align=center| 6:28
| Collinsville, Illinois, United States
| 
|-
| Loss
| align=center| 4-7
| Aaron Brink
| TKO (punches)
| Rings USA: Rising Stars Block A
| 
| align=center| 1
| align=center| 0:47
| Orem, Utah, United States
| 
|-
| Win
| align=center| 4-6
| Chris Seifert
| Decision (unanimous)
| WVF: Cage Brawl
| 
| align=center| 3
| align=center| 6:00
| Slidell, Louisiana, United States
| 
|-
| Win
| align=center| 3-6
| Joe Nameth
| Submission (punches)
| RCF 5: Reality Combat Fighting 5
| 
| align=center| 1
| align=center| 0:45
| Metairie, Louisiana, United States
| 
|-
| Loss
| align=center| 2-6
| Travis Fulton
| KO (punches)
| HOOKnSHOOT: Horizon
| 
| align=center| 1
| align=center| 2:00
| Evansville, Indiana, United States
| 
|-
| Loss
| align=center| 2-5
| Andre Roberts
| KO (elbow)
| UFC 17: Redemption
| 
| align=center| 1
| align=center| 3:15
| Mobile, Alabama, United States
| 
|-
| Loss
| align=center| 2-4
| Alex Hunter
| Decision (split)
| UFC 15: Collision Course
| 
| align=center| 1
| align=center| 10:00
| Bay St. Louis, Mississippi, United States
| 
|-
| Loss
| align=center| 2-3
| Frank Laughing
| Submission (exhaustion)
| IFC 4: Akwesasane
| 
| align=center| 1
| align=center| 7:26
| Hogansburg, New York, United States
| 
|-
| Loss
| align=center| 2-2
| Wes Gassaway
| N/A
| IFC 3: International Fighting Championship 3
| 
| align=center| 0
| align=center| 0:00
| Mobile, Alabama, United States
| 
|-
| Win
| align=center| 2-1
| Matt Teu
| N/A
| IFC 3: International Fighting Championship 3
| 
| align=center| 0
| align=center| 0:00
| Mobile, Alabama, United States
| 
|-
| Win
| align=center| 1-1
| Rob Morris
| N/A
| IFC 3: International Fighting Championship 3
| 
| align=center| 0
| align=center| 0:00
| Mobile, Alabama, United States
| 
|-
| Loss
| align=center| 0-1
| Gerry Harris
| Submission (guillotine choke)
| IFC 2: Mayhem in Mississippi
| 
| align=center| 1
| align=center| 2:07
| Biloxi, Mississippi, United States
|

See also
List of male mixed martial artists

References

External links
 
 

1968 births
American male mixed martial artists
Super heavyweight mixed martial artists
Living people
Ultimate Fighting Championship male fighters